Malacca Central was a federal constituency in Malacca, Malaysia, that has been represented in the Federal Legislative Council from 1955 to 1959.

The federal constituency was created in the 1955 redistribution and is mandated to return a single member to the Federal Legislative Council under the first past the post voting system.

History 
It was abolished in 1959 when it was redistributed.

Representation history

State constituency

Election results

References 

Defunct Malacca federal constituencies
1955 establishments in Malaya
1959 disestablishments in Malaya